Carlos is an unincorporated community located in McDowell County, West Virginia, United States. Carlos lies along the Norfolk and Western Railroad on the Dry Fork.

References 

Unincorporated communities in McDowell County, West Virginia
Unincorporated communities in West Virginia